Viktor Savelyevich Onopko (born 14 October 1969) is a Russian football coach and a former defender of Ukrainian origin. He is an assistant coach with FC Rostov and the Russia national football team.

He held the record for most international appearances for the Russian national team until 8 September 2015, when he was overtaken by Sergei Ignashevich.

Club career
Born in Voroshilovgrad (now Luhansk), Soviet Union, Onopko's career as a player started in 1986 and finished in 2005; during this time he played for Shakhtar Donetsk, Spartak Moscow, Real Oviedo, Rayo Vallecano, Alania Vladikavkaz and FC Saturn.

International career
Although he was eligible to play for Ukraine, Onopko chose to play for Russia and amassed 109 caps (plus 4 for the CIS, including the ones in Euro 92), the first coming in 1992. He played in the 1994 and 2002 World Cups, as well as Euro 96. Onopko was in the preliminary squad for Euro 2004 but was dropped due to injury. With the national team, in 2003 he won the Cyprus friendly tournament

In 2009, he was part of the Russia squad that won the 2009 Legends Cup.

Coaching career
He worked for 11 years as an assistant coach for PFC CSKA Moscow.

On 26 July 2021, he was hired as an assistant to Valeri Karpin in the Russia national football team. On 28 February 2022, FIFA and UEFA suspended Russian clubs and national teams from international competition until further notice due to the Russian invasion of Ukraine. For the duration of the ban, Karpin returned to manage FC Rostov (while also staying on as the national team coach), Onopko joined him at the club as an assistant.

Personal life
Viktor has a younger brother, Serhiy, who also played as a professional footballer.

Career statistics

Club

Honours

Club

Spartak Moscow
 Russian Premier League champion: 1992, 1993, 1994
 Soviet Cup winner: 1992
 Russian Cup winner: 1994

Individual
 Footballer of the Year in Russia (Futbol magazine): 1992, 1993
 Footballer of the Year in Russia (Sport-Express newspaper): 1993

External links
 Victor Onopko on RSSSF website
 Onopko on Legioner website (career, statistic, goals)

See also
 List of men's footballers with 100 or more international caps

References

1969 births
Living people
Footballers from Luhansk
1994 FIFA World Cup players
2002 FIFA World Cup players
Dual internationalists (football)
FC Dynamo Kyiv players
FC Spartak Vladikavkaz players
FC Saturn Ramenskoye players
FC Shakhtar Donetsk players
FC Spartak Moscow players
FIFA Century Club
Association football defenders
La Liga players
Segunda División players
Rayo Vallecano players
Real Oviedo players
Russia international footballers
Russian expatriate footballers
Russian expatriate sportspeople in Spain
Russian footballers
Russian Premier League players
Ukrainian emigrants to Russia
Ukrainian footballers
Soviet footballers
Soviet Top League players
UEFA Euro 1992 players
UEFA Euro 1996 players
Expatriate footballers in Spain
PFC CSKA Moscow